Benko, Benkó (pron. [benko]) or Benkö, Benkő (pron. ) may refer to:

Arts and entertainment
Filip Benko (born 1986), Swedish actor
Gregor Benko (born 1944), American writer, lecturer, record producer, and collector-historian
Gyula Benkő (1918–1997), Hungarian actor
Péter Benkő (born 1947), Hungarian actor
Tina Benko, American actress

Games and sport

Chess
Francisco Benkö (1910–2010), German-Argentine chess player and problemist
Pal Benko (1928–2019), Hungarian-American chess player, author, and composer of endgame studies and chess problems

Football
Aleksandar Benko (1925–1991), Croatian footballer
 Fabian Benko (born 1998), German-Croatian footballer
Günter Benkö (born 1955), retired football (soccer) referee from Austria
Jože Benko (born 1980), Slovenian football striker
Leon Benko (born 1983), Croatian football striker

Sprint canoeing
Katalin Benkő (born 1941), Hungarian sprint canoeist, competed in the 1960s
Tamás Benkő, Hungarian sprint canoeist who competed in the late 1970s
Zoltán Benkő (born 1983), Hungarian sprint canoeist, competed since the mid-2000s

Other
Gregory Benko (born 1952), retired Australian foil fencer
Lindsay Benko (born 1976), U.S. Olympic and former World Record holding freestyle swimmer
Tibor Benkő (1905–1988), Hungarian fencer and modern pentathlete

Other
Andrés Benkö (born 1943), founder and president of the Universidad Americana of Paraguay
René Benko (born 1977), Austrian property investor and founder of Signa Holding

See also
Benko Gambit, chess opening
Benko Opening, chess opening
Benkow

de:Benkö